In Blissful Company is the first studio album by the English group Quintessence.

Track listing

Original LP 
Side one
 "Giants" (Raja Ram, Shiva Shankar Jones, Stanley Barr) – 4:37
 "Manco Capac" (Raja Ram, Shambhu Babaji, Shiva Shankar Jones) – 5:17
 "Body" (Allan Mostert, Jake Milton, Shambhu Babaji, Shiva Shankar Jones) – 3:34
 "Gange Mai" (Raja Ram, Shambhu Babaji, Shiva Shankar Jones) – 4:00
 "Chant" (John Barham, Shiva Shankar Jones) – 3:02
Side two
 "Pearl and Bird" (Allan Mostert, Raja Ram, Shambhu Babaji) – 3:57
 "Notting Hill Gate" (Raja Ram, Shiva Shankar Jones) – 4:38
 "Midnight Mode" (Allan Mostert, John Barham, Raja Ram, Shiva Shankar Jones) – 9:15

CD bonus tracks 
 "Notting Hill Gate" – 2:31
 "Move into the Light" – 3:26

Personnel
Quintessence
 Sambhu Babaji – bass guitar
 Maha Dev – rhythm guitar
 Shiva Shankar Jones – lead vocals, keyboards
 Jake Milton – drums
 Allan Mostert – lead guitar
 Raja Ram – flute, bells, percussion
Additional personnel
 John Barham – musical arrangements, musical director
 Mike – sitar
 Surya – tamboura
Technical
Barney Bubbles, J. Moonman - cover design
Gopala - front cover artwork, illustration

References 

1969 debut albums
Quintessence (English band) albums
Island Records albums